Axtaçı (also, Akhtachi, Akhtachi-Sovet, Akhtachy, Akhtachy-Karabudzhak, Karabudzhak, and Qarabujaq) is a village and municipality in the Kurdamir Rayon of Azerbaijan.

References 

Populated places in Kurdamir District